Leonardo da Vinci (1452–1519) was an Italian Renaissance polymath.

Leonardo da Vinci may also refer to:

Leonardo da Vinci (Stanley book)
Leonardo da Vinci (video game), a 1997 educational game
SS Leonardo da Vinci (1924), an ocean liner of the Società di Navigazione Transatlantica Italiana
SS Leonardo da Vinci (1958), an ocean liner of the Italian Line, built as a replacement for the Andrea Doria
Italian submarine Leonardo da Vinci (1939), launched in 1939
Italian submarine Leonardo da Vinci (S 510), commissioned in the Italian Navy in 1955
Italian battleship Leonardo da Vinci
Leonardo da Vinci programme, a European Commission funding programme
Leonardo da Vinci–Fiumicino Airport
Leonardo da Vinci: The Mind of the Renaissance, a 1996 illustrated book by Alessandro Vezzosi

See also
List of things named after Leonardo da Vinci
Da Vinci (disambiguation)
Leonardo Vinci (1690–1730), Italian composer best known for his operas
Leonardo DiCaprio (born 1974), American actor